"Stin Kardia Mou Mono Thlipsi" (Greek: Στην Καρδιά Μου Μόνο Θλίψη) is a song recorded by Greek-Swedish recording artist Helena Paparizou and written and produced by Grigoris Petrakos. It was released as the fifth and final single from the original edition of her debut album, Protereotita (2004). The song is a downtempo laïko ballad which lyrically speaks of sadness after a break-up and wishing the person to return. It was released in early 2005 shortly after the Hellenic Broadcasting Corporation's (ERT) announcement of Paparizou as Greece's entrant in the Eurovision Song Contest 2005. The song was not heavily promoted and a proper video was not filmed; rather the video was made at the set of a television interview special she had done in Stockholm. It failed to impact the charts and stands as one of her least successful singles in Greece and Cyprus. She has performed it in a few of her concerts and residency shows. The video was also included on her first video album, Number One (2005).

Music video
An official music video was never produced due to time conflicts.

Track listing
 Stin Kardia Mou Mono Thlipsi 3:01

References 

2005 singles
Helena Paparizou songs
Greek-language songs